Mohammed Nazir Bin Lep  (also referred to as Lillie) is a Malaysian national alleged to be affiliated with Jemaah Islamiyah and al-Qaeda, currently in American DoD custody in the Guantanamo Bay detention camp. He is one of 119 detainees  previously held at secret Black Sites abroad, which included being subjected to Enhanced Interrogation Techniques. He is currently awaiting trial in a military commission. In the ODNI biographies, Bin Lep is described as a high value detainee and lieutenant of Hambali (along with another alleged subordinate, Mohamad Farik Amin).
He was transferred from clandestine custody to the Guantanamo Bay detention camps, in Cuba, on September 6, 2006.

Early life
Mohammed Nazir Bin Lep was born in 1976 in Johor, Malaysia. Bin Lep received a degree in architecture from Polytechnic University Malaysia. After completing his degree, Bin Lep completed compulsory military service in the Malaysian Army.

Guantanamo detainment
Mohammed Nazir Bin Lep has been detained in Guantanamo Bay since 2006 when he was transferred into DoD custody.  Throughout Bin Lap's internment, the Malaysian Government has sought to repatriate him in addition to another Malaysian national held in Guantanamo Bay.

Arraignment
In August 2021, Mohammed Nazir Bin Lep, Hambali, and Mohamad Farik Amin were charged by the United States government with murder and terrorism for their involvement in the 2003 Marriott Hotel bombing.

Guantanamo Review Task Force

On January 21, 2009, the day he was inaugurated, United States President Barack Obama issued three executive orders related to the detention of individuals in Guantanamo Bay detention camp.
That new review system was composed of officials from six departments, where the OARDEC reviews were conducted entirely by the Department of Defense. When it reported back, a year later, the Guantanamo Review Task Force classified some individuals as too dangerous to be transferred from Guantanamo, even though there was insufficient evidence to justify charging them. On April 9, 2013, that document was made public after a Freedom of Information Act request.
Bin Lep was one of the 71 individuals deemed unable to be charged due to insufficient evidence, but too dangerous to release.
Obama said those deemed unable to be charged due to insufficient evidence but too dangerous to release would start to receive reviews from a Periodic Review Board.

Periodic Review Board

The first review wasn't convened until November 20, 2013. , 29 individuals had reviews, but Bin Lep wasn't one of them. Bin Lep was denied approval for transfer on September 15, 2016.

References

External links

 Secret Prison on Diego Garcia Confirmed: Six “High-Value” Guantánamo Prisoners Held, Plus “Ghost Prisoner” Mustafa Setmariam Nasar Andy Worthington
 UN Secret Detention Report (Part One): The CIA’s “High-Value Detainee” Program and Secret Prisons Andy Worthington

1976 births
Detainees of the Guantanamo Bay detention camp
Malaysian al-Qaeda members
Malaysian extrajudicial prisoners of the United States
Living people
People subject to extraordinary rendition by the United States